Sheila Healey (née Bellamy) (1915 – 2017) was a British artist who worked in California, Mexico, and the United Kingdom.

Healey was born in Buenos Aires, Argentina to Anglo-Scots parents. After attending school in West Sussex and Kent, she taught English in Argentina after the death of her father in 1930. In 1935 she moved to England to stay with her sisters. Marrying Hal Foote, they moved to Mexico City in 1936 where she studied painting and drawing with Angelina Beloff, the first wife of Diego Rivera. Here, during the period of the Mexican art renaissance, she met José Clemente Orozco who admired her work and advised her: throw away your art books – just work. In 1938 they moved to Guatemala City; her marriage ended after 5 years and in 1940 she met archaeologist explorer Giles Healey whom she married in 1943, settling in Los Angeles before a further filming trip to Mexico. Encouraged by sculptor Henry Moore in New York in 1946, they moved westwards to Pacific Palisades and in 1947 she studied with both Rico Lebrun and William Brice in Los Angeles. After moving to West Sussex from Big Sur, California in 1970, she learnt that many of her paintings had been destroyed in a fire in Big Sur in 1971. During her time in Mexico and Big Sur, the Healeys' friendships with other artists are well documented; such as Lee Mullican, Luchita Hurtado, Kaffe Fassett, and Charles and Ray Eames.

Sheila Healey's changing themes over 75 years have displayed continuity with both the portrait and with handling of colour, "an essential human-ness being seen as a consistent thread through all her art."

Textile artist and designer Kaffe Fassett opened the 2012 Exhibition with the following statement: Growing up barefoot in Big Sur, California, I first learned about colour from Sheila Healey; She is a great collector of colour. I think of her work as repeating pools of colour; that deep red palette that comes from South America. It's just so life-enhancing. It's blood red. It's the source of things. When I'm teaching my workshops I always say that what we're trying to do is make colour glow. That is what our task is. Make it come alive! Don't kill it! Don’t make it drop dead! And this woman, whose show I'm so happy to be here for, makes colour glow.

Exhibitions
1943: Vincent Price Gallery, Beverley Hills

1946: Guatemala City

1947: Pasadena Art Institute, Pasadena

1947: Los Angeles County Museum of Art

1947: University of California, Los Angeles

1948: Norlyst Gallery, New York City solo show

1954–64: Coast Gallery, Big Sur, California

1999: Sheila Healey Retrospective: A Painter's Journey: from Buenos Aires to Big Sur; Cork Street, 20 September – 2 October

2005: Sheila Healey: A Celebration; Cork Street, 31 May – 4 June

2012: Sheila Healey: A Retrospective; Lewis Elton Gallery, University of Surrey, 20 March – 4 April

Portrait of Healey
Healey agreed to sit for sculptor Jon Edgar in West Sussex during 2010 and the terracotta head was unveiled at her Retrospective exhibition at Lewis Elton Gallery in 2012.

References

1915 births
2017 deaths
20th-century British women artists
People from Buenos Aires
People from Chichester District
British women painters
21st-century British women artists
British centenarians
Women centenarians
British expatriates in the United States
British expatriates in Mexico